The Finnish national American football team is the official American football team for Finland. It is one of the more successful National teams in Europe, having won the European championship a record five times.

Results

IFAF World Championship record

European Championship 
 1983:  2nd
 1985:  1st
 1987:  3rd
 1989:  2nd
 1991:  2nd
 1993:  1st
 1995:  1st
 1997:  1st
 2000:  1st
 2001:  2nd
 2005:  3rd
 2010: 5th
 2014: 4th
 2018:  3rd
 2021:  3rd

References

External links

Men's national American football teams
American Football
American football in Finland